Keep Your Right Up is a 1987 film, written, directed by, and starring French Swiss filmmaker Jean-Luc Godard.

In boxing, Soigne ta droite is a trainer's call to "keep your right up". The title is a reference to Jacques Tati's first short film, Soigne ton gauche (Keep Your Left Up).

Plot
Described by Godard as "a fantasy for actor, camera and tape recorder", this film is made up several sketches in which certain actors play several real or fictional roles to a background of rock music. The film is divided into three sections which inter-cross throughout. In each, a group of people search for their proper place on earth.

In the first, a group of musicians search for the right sound, the ideal harmony. In the second, a man searches for an ideal society and wonders if he is on the wrong planet. In the third, some travellers search for their destination, as Ulysses did in the bygone days.

External links

French avant-garde and experimental films
1987 films
Films directed by Jean-Luc Godard
Gaumont Film Company films
1980s French-language films
Louis Delluc Prize winners
1980s avant-garde and experimental films
1980s French films